Cafius seminitens is a species of large rove beetle in the family Staphylinidae. It is found in North America.

References

Further reading

 

Staphylininae
Articles created by Qbugbot